Secret government may refer to:
Shadow government (conspiracy)
State within a state
Deep state in the United States, alleged system
Éminence grise
Power behind the throne